The Blood Sword is a Hong Kong television series adapted from the wuxia manhua series Chinese Hero: Tales of the Blood Sword by Ma Wing-shing. The series was produced by ATV and first aired in June 1990. It was followed by a 1991 prequel, The Blood Sword 2.

Plot
The series is set in the jianghu (martial artists' community) of early 20th-century China. A grey-haired Hua Yingxiong travels alone to an island to settle an old feud between the Hua and Chi families. He has been separated from his family for over 20 years after they were ambushed by enemies while sailing back to China from America. Hua Yingxiong's wife, Jieyu, was killed by the attackers; their daughter, Hua Wenying, was thrown overboard and presumed dead; their son, Hua Jianxiong, was raised by their servant Shengnu.

Hua Jianxiong becomes bitter enemies with Situ Mowen after the latter killed Shengnu. He also encounters Taxue by chance, falls in love with her, and marries her. However, they incur the jealousy of Si-ao, the daughter of the Hua family's servant Guipu, because she has a crush on Hua Jianxiong. In the meantime, Hua Yingxiong resolves the feud and becomes an ally of Chi Lianyingwang, the Chi family patriarch. He also accepts Chi's son, Chi Yan, as his apprentice. He also develops a crush on Ziyi, one of the Chi family's mercenaries, because she resembles Jieyu in appearance.

Hua Wenying had actually survived and was renamed Qiongtian. She was raised by Yuanlaowang of the Hell School and groomed to become the school's leader. She developed a cruel and treacherous personality under Yuanlaowang's influence and eventually murdered her foster father to secure her position in the Hell School. She pretends to love Situ Mowen and manipulates him to help her. With support from Situ Mowen and the Japanese Iga School's ninjas, Qiongtian leads the Hell School to attack other martial arts schools in her ambition to dominate the jianghu. She also incites conflict between Situ Wuliang (Situ Mowen's "father") and the Iga School, after discovering that Situ Mowen is actually the biological son of the Iga School's leader.

The Huas combine forces with the Chi family and other schools to resist the Hell School and its allies. Hua Yingxiong restores peace in the jianghu after defeating and reluctantly killing his evil daughter.

Cast
 Kenny Ho as Hua Yingxiong, the protagonist of the series. The titular "Blood Sword" refers to his weapon, a red-bladed sword.
 Law Chung-wah as Hua Jianxiong, Hua Yingxiong's son.
 Veronica Yip as Ziyi, a mercenary hired by the Chi family. She is similar in appearance to Jieyu, Hua Yingxiong's deceased wife.
 Yeung Chak-lam as Chi Lianyingwang, the patriarch of the Chi family.
 Esther Kwan as Qiongtian / Hua Wenying, Hua Yingxiong's lost-long daughter who becomes the evil leader of the Hell School.
 Eric Wan as Situ Mowen, an evil martial artist who becomes Hua Jianxiong's bitter rival.
 Kwan Chan-nei as Si-ao, Guipu's daughter who has a crush on Hua Jianxiong.
 Chan Tung-mui as Taxue, Hua Jianxiong's wife.
 Lau Wun-fung as Situ Wuliang, Situ Mowen's father and a formidable antagonist. He turns out to be not Situ Mowen's real father.
 Mok Ka-yiu as Chi Yan, Chi Lianyingwang's son and Hua Yingxiong's apprentice.
 Hung Chi-shing as Guipu, Hua Yingxiong's servant.
 Jackie Lui as Yu Buwei, Hua Jianxiong's friend.
 Chan Chek-wai as Shengnu, Hua Yingxiong's servant who raised Hua Jianxiong.

See also
 Chinese Hero: Tales of the Blood Sword
 A Man Called Hero
 The Blood Sword 2
 The Legend of Hero

References
 Review on spcnet.tv

Hong Kong wuxia television series
Adaptations of works by Ma Wing-shing
Asia Television original programming
1990 Hong Kong television series debuts
Television shows based on manhua
Cantonese-language television shows